The 2013 Hong Kong Sevens was the 38th edition of the Hong Kong Sevens and the sixth tournament of the 2012–13 IRB Sevens World Series. It was hosted by its long-time home, Hong Kong Stadium.

Fiji won the title by defeating Wales 26–19 in the final.

Format
The teams were divided into pools of four teams, who played a round-robin within the pool. Points were awarded in each pool on the standard schedule for rugby sevens tournaments (though different from the standard in the 15-man game)—3 for a win, 2 for a draw, 1 for a loss.

Building on the changes made for the 2012 Hong Kong Sevens, in which two separate 12-team competitions were contested, the International Rugby Board (IRB) expanded the event to a total of 28 teams, again divided into two competitions.

The main draw consisted of 16 teams—the same number that were involved in all regular series events. The contestants were the 15 core teams guaranteed of places in each series event, plus Hong Kong, which qualified as winner of the 2012 HSBC Asian Sevens Series. These teams competed in Pools A, B, C, and D. The winners and runners-up from each pool in the main draw qualified for the Cup quarterfinals. The losers of these quarterfinals competed in the Plate semifinals. The remaining 8 teams competed in the Bowl quarterfinals, with the losers of these matches competing in the Shield semifinals.

The second competition was the newly instituted World Series Pre-Qualifier. It featured 12 teams, specifically two qualifiers from each of IRB's six regional sevens competitions. These teams played in Pools E, F, and G. The top two teams from each pool, plus the top two third-place teams, advanced to the knockout stage. The four quarterfinal winners advanced, along with Hong Kong, to the World Series Core Team Qualifier at the 2013 London Sevens.

Teams
28 teams participated:

Main draw

World Series pre-qualifier

Main draw
The draw was made on February 21.

Pool stage

Pool A

Pool B

Pool C

Pool D

Knockout stage

Shield

Bowl

Plate

Cup

World Series pre-qualifier

Pool E

Pool F

Pool G

Ranking matches

By making it to the semifinals, Russia, Zimbabwe, Tonga, and Georgia have qualified for the Promotion tournament, along with Hong Kong and the bottom three core teams following the 2013 Scotland Sevens. The promotion tournament took place at the 2013 London Sevens.

References

External links

2013
rugby union
2012–13 IRB Sevens World Series
2013 in Asian rugby union
March 2013 sports events in Asia